The World Monuments Watch is a flagship advocacy program of the New York-based private non-profit organization World Monuments Fund (WMF) that calls international attention to cultural heritage around the world that is threatened by neglect, vandalism, conflict, or disaster.

Selection process
Every two years, it publishes a select list known as the Watch List of 100 Most Endangered Sites that are in urgent need of preservation funding and protection. The sites are nominated by governments, conservation professionals, site caretakers, non-government organizations (NGOs), concerned individuals, and others working in the field. An independent panel of international experts then select 100 candidates from these entries to be part of the Watch List, based on the significance of the sites, the urgency of the threat, and the viability of both advocacy and conservation solutions. For the succeeding two-year period until a new Watch List is published, these 100 sites can avail grants and funds from the WMF, as well as from other foundations, private donors, and corporations by capitalizing on the publicity and attention gained from the inclusion on the Watch List. Since the Watch List was launched in 1996, more than 75 percent of the enlisted threatened sites have been saved.

2008 Watch List
The 2008 World Monuments Watch List of 100 Most Endangered Sites was announced on June 6, 2007 by WMF President Bonnie Burnham. The 2008 Watch List highlights three critical man-made threats affecting the world's cultural heritage: political conflict, unchecked urban and industrial development, and global climate change.

List by country/territory

Statistics by country/territory
The following countries/territories have multiple sites entered on the 2008 Watch List, listed by the number of sites:

Notes

A. Numbers list only meant as a guide on this article. No official reference numbers have been designated for the sites on the Watch List.
B. Names and spellings used for the sites were based on the official 2008 Watch List as published.
C. The references to the sites' locations and periods of construction were based on the official 2008 Watch List as published.
D. Tally includes the transfrontier site of Jordan River Cultural Landscape.

References

External links
Official website of the World Monuments Fund
World Monuments Watch home page
The 2008 WMF Watch List

Historic preservation
2008 works